The Benther Berg is a ridge, up to , in the Calenberg Land near Benthe in Hanover Region in the German state of Lower Saxony.

Location 

The Benther Berg is about 3.5 kilometres long and 500 m wide. It lies west-southwest of the city of Hanover and borders immediately on the city boundary.

On the far side of Benthe to the east is Empelde. The  federal road runs by the ridge, roughly in an east-west direction, to the south and east.

History 
On the Benther Berg are protohistorical tumuli from the Bronze Age. The name of the hill comes from the nearby village of Benthe to the south.

Sources 
 Hannovers Natur entdecken, erleben, verstehen. Arbeitskreis des Verbandes Deutscher Biologen (Landesverband Niedersachsen). ed. by Elisabeth von Falkenhausen (et al.). Seelze-Velber: Kallmeyer 1998.

External links 

Harzwasserwerke

Ridges of Lower Saxony
Hanover (region)
Tumuli in Germany